This is a survey of the postage stamps and postal history of Tristan da Cunha.

Local stamps 
In 1946, labels showing penguins and the currency being potatoes were issued. The 4 potatoes red stamp was included in the miniature sheet issued in 1979 to commemorate the death centenary of Sir Rowland Hill.

First stamp 

The first stamps of Tristan da Cunha were issued on 1 January 1952 and consisted of twelve stamps of Saint Helena overprinted TRISTAN DA CUNHA. In 1954 a definitive set depicted various themes of the islands.

See also 
Postage stamps and postal history of Ascension Island
Postage stamps and postal history of Saint Helena

References

Further reading 

 Butler, Henry John, The Postal History of Tristan Da Cunha 1906 - 1950 The Philatelist magazine of the Postal History Society
 Crabb, George. The History and Postal History of Tristan da Cunha. Ewell: G. Crabb, 1980
 Crawford, Allan B. Penguins, Potatoes & Postage Stamps: A Tristan da Cunha Chronicle. Oswestry: Anthony Nelson, 1999 
 MacKay, James A. and George F. Crabb. Tristan da Cunha: Its postal history and philately. Ewell, Surrey: Published by the authors, 1965
 Mueller, Michael D. and Peter P. McCann (editors). Thirty years of St. Helena, Ascension, and Tristan da Cunha philately: a collection of new, revised and reprinted articles published by the St. Helena, Ascension and Tristan da Cunha Philatelic Society on the occasion of the 30th anniversary of the founding of the society. Morgantown: St. Helena, Ascension and Tristan Da Cunha Philatelic Society, 2006 
 Peck, Richard. Handbook of Modern Tristan da Cunha Philately. Sydney: R. Peck, 1992  Comprising: Pt. 1: Stamps & stationery; Pt. 2: Postal history and cinderellas.
 Peck, Richard C. Tristan da Cunha, the William L. Mayo accumulation. Drummoyne, NSW: Richard C. Peck, 1996
Proud, E. The Postal History of Ascension, St Helena and Tristan Da Cunha. Proud-Bailey Co. Ltd., 2005. 
 Rainey, Chris. The Postal History of Tristan Da Cunha 1892 - 1946: A display to the Royal Philatelic Society of London 25th November 2010. Chris Rainey, 2010.
 Skavaril, Russell V. (editor). St. Helena, Ascension, and Tristan da Cunha Philatelic Society's 20th anniversary anthology: original philatelic papers written by Society members to commemorate Society's 20th anniversary. Columbus, OH.: St. Helena, Ascension and Tristan Da Cunha Philatelic Society, 1997  
 Smith, Rozell. A History and The Mails: The Ships of Tristan da Cunha. Richmond-Vancouver, B.C.: Produced by R.C. Smith, 1994

External links
Official Post Office site.
St. Helena, Ascension, and Tristan da Cunha Philatelic Society
Tristan da Cunha postal history home page

Philately of Tristan da Cunha